Patch-sequencing (patch-seq) is a method designed for tackling specific problems involved in characterizing neurons.  As neural tissues are one of the most transcriptomically diverse populations of cells, classifying neurons into cell types in order to understand the circuits they form is a major challenge for neuroscientists. Combining classical classification methods with single cell RNA-sequencing post-hoc has proved to be difficult and slow. By combining multiple data modalities such as electrophysiology, sequencing and microscopy,  Patch-seq allows for neurons to be characterized in multiple ways simultaneously. It currently suffers from low throughput relative to other sequencing methods mainly due to the manual labor involved in achieving a successful patch-clamp recording on a neuron. Investigations are currently underway to automate patch-clamp technology which will improve the throughput of patch-seq as well.

Background

History of patch clamp 

Patch-seq is a specialized form of the patch clamp recording technique, the gold standard of single cell electrophysiological studies for its millisecond resolution of cellular electrophysiology, its ability to detect currents of specific ions, and perhaps most importantly for its ability to form a voltage clamp on the cell membrane.  The technique was originally developed using a small glass tube, pipette, which is rapidly heated and stretched to produce a needle like shape with an opening diameter of 3-5 millimeters.  Modern preparations use different tip diameters depending on the intended application.  The pipette is filled with a salt bath to conduct ionic currents before being pressed onto a cells surface to form an electrical seal with a high electrical resistance (measured in the unit ohm) which ensures low noise in the recording. While this seal will be of the order of megaohms, it has been found that applying slight suction will result in a seal with a resistance greater than a giga-ohm.   The high resistance seal allows the experimenter to hold the patch of membrane within the seal at a desired voltage for study of voltage-gated ion channels.  This ability to form the voltage clamp on a patch of membrane give the technique its name.  This clamp is critical for testing voltage dependent opening dynamics of ion channels which determine a membrane's resting potentials and action potentials.  The pipette solution can also be filled with specific ions in order to target particular ion channels of interest such as sodium channels, potassium channels, and calcium channels among many others. Both Erwin Neher and Bert Sakmann, the inventors of the technique, went on to win the 1991 Nobel Prize in Physiology or Medicine for developing patch clamp and using it to prove the existence of ion channels. Characterizing the opening dynamics of ion channels has provided crucial insights to physiological mechanisms underlying a diverse set of conditions from the neurological, to diabetes, and heart conditions.  Many medical conditions are the result of a channelopathy, a mutation of a gene coding for an ion channel which disrupts electrical phenomenon underlying physiological processes.

Initially the need for direct contact between the pipette and the cell membrane limited patch clamp's use to cultured cell preparations. Brain slice preparations have debris, blood and lymph vessels or off target cells which may block the pipette from its target.  In time it was found that application of enzymatic solutions enabled recordings in brain slices as well.  Neuroscience often requires concordant observation of electrophysiological dynamics and behavior to test the relationship between psychological theories and their underlying biology.  Achieving this with the delicate glass tubes with incredibly thin points extending into a tip used for patch-clamp requires significant mechanical stabilization either by head fixing the animal or use of a stabilization rig attached to the animals head.  As with brain slice preparations off target physical barriers present an issue as well, and one that cannot be removed with enzymatic solutions.  Eventually these technical challenges were overcome.  The first in vivo recording was accomplished in anesthetized head fixed cats. The chance of the pipette tip clamping off target was reduced via application of positive pressure during insertion or use of a cleaning pipette to ensure the main seal was not damaged. Eventually these techniques were extended into awake, head-fixed animals and even freely moving rodents. Patch clamp can be used to record from adjacent and nearby cells to understand how small cliques of neurons connect to each other and study sub-threshold events.

Patch clamp in comparison to other electrophysiological recording techniques 

While other modern recording techniques such as multi-electrode array and fluorescent calcium sensors have emerged as alternatives which can record from a great deal more neurons at once, patch clamp offers millisecond temporal resolution and the ability to study specific ionic currents.  By contrast the best temporal resolution offered by optogenetic recording techniques is on the order of tens of milliseconds, and due to optical interference can only be used on structure close to the surface or require removal of intervening structures.  Also critically patch-clamp offers the ability to apply a voltage clamp or a current clamp to the membrane in order to best characterize the neurons electrical properties.  No other technique gives experiments such precise control over membrane potentials. Optogenetic techniques have yet to offer anything comparable and are unlikely to ever be able to.

Neuronal cell-typing requires simultaneous capturing of multiple data modalities 

While a neurons electrical properties are an important when considering defining a cell type its morphology, types of neurotransmitters released, neurotransmitter receptors expressed at synapses, as well as the neuron's location in the nervous system and its local circuit are equally important.  Neurons come in a huge diversity of shapes with many differences in cell bodies (soma), dendrites, and axons.  The position of the dendrites determines which other neurons a cell receives its input from and their shape can have massive impacts on how a neurons responds to this input.  Likewise the targets of a neurons axon determine its outputs.  The types of synapses formed between neurons axons and dendrites are equally important as well.  For instance in the cortical microcircuit of the mammalian cortex, portrayed to the right, cells have highly specific projection patterns both within the local circuit as well as for input and output from and to other cortical and non-cortical regions.  Dendritic geometry can influence the electrical behavior of a neurons as well, having a massive influence on how dendrites process input in the form of postsynaptic potentials.  Disordered geometry and projection patterns has been linked to a diverse set of psychiatric and neurological conditions including autism and schizophrenia though the behavioral relevance of these phenotypes is not yet understood. Neuronal cell types appeared to often vary continuously between each other.  Previous attempts at neuronal classification by morpho-electric properties have been limited by the use of incompatible methodologies and different cell line selection.

With the advent of single-cell RNA-sequencing (scRNA-seq) it was hoped that there would exist genes that would be consistently expressed only in neurons with specific classically defined properties.  These genes would serve as cell markers.  This would provide a better means to delineate neuron types quickly and easily using only mRNA sequencing.  However it appeared that scRNA-seq only served to reinforce the fact that overly rigid cell type definitions are not always the best way to characterize neurons.  Furthermore gene expression is dynamically regulated, varying over various time scales in response to activity in cell type specific ways to allow for neuronal plasticity.  Like other tissues developmental processes also need to be considered.  Matching results from scRNA-seq to classically defined neuronal cell types is very challenging for all these reasons and additionally single-cell RNA-seq has its own draw backs for neuronal classification.  While scRNA-seq enables the study of gene expression patterns from individual neurons, it disrupts the tissue for individual cell isolation and thus it is difficult to infer a neuron's original position in the tissue or observe its morphology.  Linking the sequencing information to a neuronal subtype, defined previously by electrophysiological and morphological characteristics is a slow and complicated process. The simultaneous capture and integration of multiple data types by patch-seq makes it ideal for neuronal classification, uncovering new correlations between gene expression, electrophysiological and morphological properties and neuronal function. This makes patch-seq a truly interdisciplinary method, requiring collaboration between specialists in electrophysiology, sequencing, and imaging.

Preparation and model system choice 
Patch-seq can be done in any model system including cell culture for neurons.  Neurons for culture may be collected from neuronal tissue then disassociated or made from induced pluripotent stem cells (iPSC), neurons that have been grown out of human stem cell lines. Cell culture preparation is the easiest to apply patch clamp to and give the experimenter control over what ligands the neuron is exposed to, for instance hormones or neurotransmitters.  The benefit of total experimental control however also means the neurons are not subject to the natural environment they would be exposed to during development.  As mention previously the position their dendrites and axons extend into as well as the neuron's position with a brain structure is incredibly important for understanding its role within a circuit. Many preparations exist for brain slices from different animal species.  Owing to the presence of cell or debris in the way of the pipette and a target cell the preparation will need to be slightly modified, often slight positive pressure is applied to the pipette to prevent any unintended seals from forming.  If understanding how behavior is tied to the dynamics of the neuronal events is of interest it is possible to record in vivo  as well.  Though adapting patch clamp for in vivo studies can be very difficult for mechanical reasons especially during a behavioral task but has been done.  Automated in vivo patch clamp methods have been developed.  Very little difference exists between preparations for mammalian species though the greater diversity of neuronal sizes in non-human primate and primate cortex may necessitate using different tip diameters and pressures for forming seals without killing target neurons.  Patch-seq is also applied to non-neuronal studies such as pancreatic or cardiac cells.

Patch-sequencing workflow 
After choosing a model system and preparation type patch-seq experiments have a similar workflow.  First a seal between the cell and the pipette is established so that recording and collection may take place.  Cells can be filled with a fluorescent label for imaging during recording.  Following recording negative pressure is applied to capture the cytosol and often the nucleus for sequencing.  This process is repeated until cells in the preparation have degraded and are not worth collecting data from.  Post-hoc analysis of imaging data allows for morphological reconstruction.  Like wise complex post-hoc processing of transcriptomic data is often required as well in order to handle a large number of confounds when collecting cytosolic contents from cells via the pipette.

Forming the seal between pipette and cell 

The patch pipette is designed for whole cell recording so its opening diameter is larger than experiments done to examine single ion-channels.  For the most part standard patch clamp protocols may be used although there are some small situation dependent modifications to the pipette and the internal solution.  An even wider diameter may be used to facilitate the aspiration of the inside of the cell into the pipette but it may need to be adjusted based on the target cell type. Negative pressure is applied to enhance the seal which will be better for recording as well as prevent intra-cellular fluid leakage and contamination after or during collection of cell contents for sequencing.  During recording biotin can be diffused into the cell via the pipette for imaging and later morphological reconstruction.

Electrophysiological recording 
Once a seal has been established cells are subject to different stimulation regimes using the voltage clamp, such as ramps, square pulses and noisy current injections.  Features of the cell body's membrane are recorded including resting membrane potential and threshold potential.  Features observed from generated action potentials (AP) such as AP width, AP amplitude, after-depolarization and after-hyperpolarization amplitude are also recorded.  Whole-cell recordings are performed using patch recoding pipettes filled with a small volume of intracellular solution (to avoid RNA dilution), calcium chelators, RNA carriers and RNase inhibitors. The addition of RNase inhibitors, such as EGTA, enhances transcriptome analysis by preserving higher quality RNA from the samples. Recording time can take between 1 and 15 minutes without affecting the neuron structure due to swelling, with lower values increasing throughput of the technique. The data is recorded and analyzed with commercial or open-source software such as MIES, PATCHMASTER, pCLAMP, WaveSurfer, among others.

Neurons are pre-stimulated to verify their resting membrane potential and stabilize their baseline across and within experiments.  Cells are then stimulated by ramp and square currents, their electrophysiological properties are recorded and measured.  After stimulus the membrane potential must return to the baseline value for recordings to be consistent and robust.  Negative pressure is used at the end of the recordings to return the membrane stability.  Measurements need to satisfy these conditions to be considered for further analysis.  During recording cell viability needs to be maintained as being patch-clamped is stressful for the cell.

Nucleus extraction 
Negative pressure is used to move the nucleus near the pipette tip while moving the electrode near the center of the soma. The model system in question will affect the negative pressure to be applied.  In human and non-human primates cell viability is more difficult to ensure.  Larger variations in neuronal size compared to rodent models means greater variability in the amount of negative pressure needed to be applied to extract the cytosol and nucleus. After retrieval the pipette is slowly retracted while maintaining negative pressure until the membrane surrounding the nucleus breaks off from the cell with the tip forming a membrane seal.  The membrane seal traps the contents extracted in the pipette and prevents contamination during removal for sequencing before preparing the pipette for another recording. The construction of the seal can be observed electrically by the increase in resistance (MΩ). The retrieval process is slow, often taking around ten minutes, as precision is needed to not burst the cell.

Transcriptomics 
RNA-seq analysis is performed using the nucleus and cytosol extracted from the recorded neurons. RNA is amplified to full length cDNA and libraries are constructed for sequencing.  Analyses including the nucleus not only have higher yields of mRNA but have increased data quality.

Samples present a high degree of variability in the RNA content, in some cases including RNA contamination from adjacent cells such as astrocytes or other types of neurons.  Quality is assessed by defined marker genes, indicating if the RNA content includes targets of the cell class of interest (on marker) and lacks any contamination markers (off marker).  Various metrics are used to judge the quality of collected RNA.

 Normalized marker sum (NMS) score: the ratio of on marker genes from the patch-seq cell relative to median expression of the same genes from an analogous data using cellular dissociation methods such as fluorescence-activated cell sorting (FACS). Cellular dissociation methods have reduced technical issues and acts as a standardization method. The score measures the gene expression similarity pattern from the sample to a known cell class. Lower NMS scores indicate a reduced detection of on marker genes, more than an increase of off marker genes.
 Contamination score: Indicates the likelihood of RNA contamination from near cells during extraction. Contamination may arise from pipette travel to the soma interacting with other neuronal processes. It is calculated as the sum of the NMS score from all broad cell types that does not match the assigned cell class.
 Quality score: Measures the correlation between on and off marker genes from the patch-seq result with the average expression profile of cells analyzed using cellular dissociation methods of the same type.
 Nucleus presence markers: Detection of nuclear specific genes (such as Malat1 in mammals) and increased ratio of intronic reads provide evidence for nucleus incorporation in RNA-seq analysis.

Morphological reconstruction 
Neuron shape and structure, such as dendritic/axonal arborization, axonal geometry, synaptic contacts and soma location, is used for neuronal type classification. In acute slice preparations or in vivo the laminar position is noted as it has important functional consequences as well.  The staining by biotin is performed during neuron electrophysiological recording. Alternatively rhodamine added outside the cell allows for imagine the living cell prior to recording.  Imaging is done by two-dimensional tiled images by bright field transmission and fluorescence channels on individual cells and then processed in commercial or open-source software.  Higher resolution images can be obtained from cultured neurons in comparison to acute slices, yielding higher quality morphological reconstructions.

Post-hoc 3D reconstruction is made by image processing software such as TReMAP, Mozak, or Vaa3D. Quality of the outcome depends on a variety of factors from the electrophysiological recording time to the nucleus extraction procedure.  Reconstructed cells are then categorized in four levels of quality depending on their integrity and completeness of the structure. High quality if somas and processes are fully visible and proper digital reconstruction is possible, medium quality if somas and some processes are visible but are nor compatible with 3D reconstruction, insufficient axon where dendrites are filled with biotin but axons are weakly dyed, and failed fills that lack soma staining likely due to the subside of the structure post nuclear extraction.

Downstream data analysis 

Designing workflow for processing and combining the resulting multimodal data depends on the particular research question patch-seq is being applied to.  In cell typing studies the data should be compared with existing scRNA-seq studies with larger sample sizes (in the order of thousands of cells compared to tens or hundreds) and therefore greater statistical power for cell type identification using transcriptomic data alone.  Correlation based methods are sufficient for this step.  Dimensionality reduction methods such as T-distributed stochastic neighbor embedding or uniform manifold approximation and projection can then be used for visualization of the collected data's position on a reference atlas of higher quality scRNA-seq data. Machine learning can be applied in order to relate the gene expression data to the morphological and electrophysiological data.  Methods for doing so include autoencoders, bottleneck networks, or other rank reduction methods.  Including morphological data has proven to be challenging as it is a computer vision task, a notoriously complicated problem in machine learning.  It is difficult to represent imaging data from the morphological reconstructions as a feature vector for including in the analysis.

Applications 
Patch-seq integrative dataset allows for a comprehensive characterization of cell types, particularly in neurons. Neuroscientists have applied this technique to a variety of experiments and protocols to discover new cell subtypes based on correlations between transcriptomic data and neuronal morpho-electric properties.  Applying machine learning to patch-seq data it is then possible to study transcriptomic data and link it to their respective morpho-electric properties. Having a confirmed ground truth for robust cell type classification allows researchers to look at the function of specific neuron types and subtypes in complex processes such as behavior, language and the underlying processes in neurological and psychiatric diseases.  Comparison of proteomics with transcriptomics has shown that transcriptional data does not necessarily translate into the same protein expression and likewise having the ability to look at the ground truth of a neuron's phenotype from classical classification methods combined with transcriptomic data is important for neuroscience.  Patch-seq experiments have been found which support transcriptomic results but others have found cases where morphology of similar transcriptomically defined cell types in different brain regions did not match up.  The technique is particularly well suited for neuroscience but in general any tissue where it is of interest to simultaneous know electrophysiology, morphology, and transcriptomics would find use for patch-seq.  For instance patch-seq has also been applied to non-neuronal tissues such as pancreatic islets for studying diabetes. 

 Targeted neuronal populations studies: Patch-seq excels compared to other methodologies in its capacity to measure and extract genetic information from targeted neurons without having to disrupt the sample. This allows for precise trace-back of the transcriptomic data to the neuron properties, such as its connectivity, the location in the slice, morphology.  Correlation studies between these data types help identify differential expression genes across neuronal types and discover genetic markers for fast classification.
 Compilation and integration of multimodal cell type databases: Patch-seq has been used to integrate neuron functional characteristics to the large transcriptional databases from single cell RNA-seq studies.  Patch-seq can provide electrophysiological and morphological data, with morphology being less common due to the difficulty in achieving high quality standards. Integration of the multimodal data is necessary as correct labeling of cell type is unobtainable from just one data type.  Previous research has shown that transcriptomically similar neurons can have different morpho-electrical characteristics.
 Molecular basis of morphological and functional diversity: Research into the molecular mechanisms that define the morphological and function diversity of neurons is ongoing. Patch-seq allows the identification of differential expressed genes between known distinct cell types. Small changes in gene expression can cause cells to display a different response to stimuli, underlining the importance of correlating this data for proper classification.

Limitations 
The most serious limitation to patch-seq is a limitation shared by patch clamp techniques generally, that being the requirement of high fidelity and dexterous manual labor.  Patch clamping has been described as an art form and requires practice to perfect the technique.  So not only is it labor-intensive but also takes years of training to prefect the technique.  To date the largest patch-seq study was done in acute cortical slices of mouse primary visual cortex.  Just over 4000 neurons were patched and sequenced from and the effort required a huge amount of manual labor.  Most other data sets were collected from tens or hundreds of cells.  Significantly less than cells collected for sequencing by dissociating the tissue.  Nevertheless no other electrophysiological recording's technique can match patch-seq's temporal resolution or ability to characterize specific ionic currents nor offer the capacity to produce a voltage clamp.  For these reasons automating the technique is an area of active investigation by many laboratories around the world for applications using patch clamping including patch-seq.

Morphological reconstruction via digital imaging is another limitation of the technique with pass rates often lower than 50%. The proper integration of the massive number of images with high quantities of noise, and the structural disruption caused by nucleus extraction, makes it a computational challenge in neuroscience.  New automatic tracing methods are being developed, but quality remains low.

Future directions

Integrating other sequencing technologies, proteomics, and single cell genetic manipulation 
So far the only sequencing technology used has been mRNA sequencing.  Including other modalities as well would increase the number of "omics" included in the data generated.  For instance a technique for separating the mRNA from the DNA could allow for studying modifications on the DNA.  Chromatin accessibility could be judged from DNA methylation and using methylated DNA immunoprecipitation and histone acetylation and deacetylation from ChIP sequencing. This would enable study of epigenetics in patch-seq experiments.  Likewise separating out proteins would be useful for judging protein abundances allowing for integration with proteomics. CRISPR could be included in the pipette and injected during recording to examine the effects of mutation at the single cell level.

Auto-patching 

The biggest bottle neck to the throughput of patch-seq is the labor required for patch clamping.  Slowly automated patch clamp is beginning to become the norm but as of yet has not reached wide adoption. This is despite some auto-pathing rigs having a higher successfully attempted seal rate and data collection rate than humans.  Automated patch clamping can either be done blind without imaging information instead relying on pressure sensors to provide input for algorithms guiding robotic rigs to form seals and record.  Alternatively image guided algorithms exist as well allow for targeting of fluorescently labeled cells.  Some systems are better suited to particular model systems and preparations.

See also 
 Patch clamp
 Single-cell omics
 Single-cell sequencing
 RNA-Seq
 MAP-Seq
 Neuromorphology
 Neuronal tracing 
Electrophysiology 
Automated patch clamp

References 

Electrophysiology
RNA sequencing